Uptown Comedy Club, is a sketch-comedy show filmed in the Harlem neighborhood of Manhattan in New York City that aired in first-run syndication for two seasons, from 1992 until 1994. The series was produced by Bob Banner. Repeats of the series eventually found their way onto BET.

Taped before a live audience at a club in Harlem, Uptown Comedy Club provided a mixture stand-up comedy, musical guests usually from the world of hip-hop, and sketch comedy from a troupe of mostly black comics. Jim Breuer and Rob Magnotti were the only regular white cast members. Uptown Comedy Club would in hindsight, provide a springboard for future Saturday Night Live cast members Jim Breuer and Tracy Morgan and future Mad TV cast members Aries Spears and Debra Wilson. Monteria Ivey served as the host for the first season, while the regular cast members rotated in that capacity for the second. DJ Scratch meanwhile, was the resident DJ.

A recurring segment on Uptown Comedy Club was pitting stand-up comedians against each other in a game of The Dozens. The audience picked the winner.

Cast
Flex Alexander
Arceneaux & Mitchell
Jim Breuer
Ronda Fowler
Little Rascal (1993–1994) 
Rob Magnotti
Tracy Morgan (1993–1994) 
Corwin Moore (1992–1993) 
Domencio 'Macio' Parrilla
Aries Spears
Debra Wilson (1992–1993)

Special guests

Stand-ups featured
Mark Anthony 
D.C. Benny
Brooklyn Mike
 Xavier Paul Cadeau
Ian Edwards
Pierre Edwards
Talent Harris
T.P. Hearns
Robert L. Hines
"Hamburger" Jones
Kevin Jordan
Brad Lowery
Faizon Love
Carlos Mencia
James McNair
Mo'Nique
Hugh Moore
Mark Overton
Dwayne Perkins 
Reynaldo Rey
Keith Robinson
Rickey Smiley
Sommore
Chris Tucker
Sheryl Underwood

Musical guests featured
Mary J. Blige
Brand Nubian
Das EFX
Father MC
Fat Joe
Fu-Schnickens
Gang Starr
Kris Kross
KRS-One 
Luke
Mad Cobra
MC Lyte
Pharcyde 
Redman
Pete Rock & CL Smooth
Super Cat
SWV
Christopher Williams
Wu-Tang Clan
Yo-Yo

Stations
Uptown Comedy Club aired mostly late at night on UHF stations.

See also
List of ViacomCBS television programs#Rysher Entertainment

References

External links
 
 Uptown Comedy Club Archives - The Humor Mill

1992 American television series debuts
1994 American television series endings
1990s American black television series
1990s American sketch comedy television series
1990s American stand-up comedy television series
1990s American variety television series
First-run syndicated television programs in the United States
African-American television
Hip hop television
English-language television shows